Hvittingfoss is a village in the municipality of Kongsberg in  Buskerud, Norway. Hvittingfoss has traditionally been associated with the manufacture of pulp, paper and paper products.

History
Prior to the municipal merger in 1964, Hvittingfoss  was in Ytre Sandsvær.  Hvittingfoss borders Lardal and Hof.  Hvittingfoss is located about 30 kilometers from Kongsberg. The river Numedalslågen runs through the village. The village population (2005) is 1,016.

Industrial development was driven by the waterfalls of Hvittingfoss as far back as the 17th century. In 1651, there were reportedly five sawmills in the northern waterfall, called Nord-fossen. The royal privileges of  Vittingfossen  was given to the counts in Jarlsberg and Larvik. Industrialist Christian August Anker (1840-1912) developed Hønefoss Træsliberi which started its production of wood pulp in 1881.

The pulp and paper group Edward Lloyd Limited, owner of Lloyd's Illustrated London Newspaper and the Daily Chronicle in London, operated huge paper mills in Kemsley, England.  The firm bought Hønefoss Træsliberi in 1902 in order to obtain a ready supply of wood pulp. In 1906, the Lloyd company  built  a paper mill on Hvittingfoss with a capacity of approx. 2000 ton press of thin paper for the Asian market. In 1916, the Lloyd firm sold all plants and waterfalls rights to a consortium led by a Captain Hjalmar Johansen. The Lloyd interests  reserved the right to lease and operate the plants for 14 years. In 1932 the Lloyd company completed its business on Hvittingfoss after 30 years of operation.

Vittingfoss power plant 
Vittingfoss power plant  (Vittingfoss kraftverk) is located on the Numedalslågen just off the center of Hvittingfoss. The power plant was a built in conjunction with a dam in 1910. The plant has five units, four with vertical Francis turbines, and one with a Kaplan turbine.; the two eldest of approximately 4.5 MW each were put into operation in 1919 and 1920, the third (4.8 MW) in 1949, the fourth (6.8 MW) in 1981 and the fifth (14.5 MW) in 2014 .

Tuft Church
Tuft Church (Tuft kyrkje) is  located just outside Hvittingfoss. The church was erected in 1880. The edifice is made of brick and has 150 seats. It was constructed as a replacement for Tupta Kirkja a stave church which had dated to the 1200s.

References

Other sources
Anker-Rasch, Ole (2006) Christian August Anker - Industripioner og grunder fra Rød Herregård (Oslo: Andresen & Butenssschøn)

External links
Hvittingfoss primary and secondary school

Villages in Buskerud
Populated places on the Numedalslågen